Kevin Lane Keller (born June 23, 1956) is the E. B. Osborn Professor of Marketing at the Tuck School of Business at Dartmouth College.  He is most notable for having authored Strategic Brand Management (Prentice Hall, 1998, 2002, 2008 and 2012), a widely used text on brand management. The book is focused on the "how to" and "why" of brand management, this strategy guide provides specific tactical guidelines for planning, building, measuring, and managing brand equity. He has published his research in the Journal of Marketing, Journal of Marketing Research, and Journal of Consumer Research. In addition, Philip Kotler selected Keller to be his co-author on the most recent edition of Kotler's market-leading text Marketing Management.

Keller was formerly on the faculty at the Stanford Graduate School of Business, the University of California, Berkeley and the University of North Carolina at Chapel Hill.  He has served as a visiting professor at Duke University and the Australian Graduate School of Management.  He is an alumnus of Cornell University, Carnegie-Mellon University and Duke University.

In the private sector, Keller often acts as a consultant on branding, speaks at industry conferences, and helps to manage the rock band The Church.

Keller currently resides in Etna, New Hampshire.

Books 
 Kotler, Philip/Keller, Kevin Lane: Marketing Management, 13th edition, Upper Saddle River, NJ: Prentice-Hall, 2009,  
 Keller, Kevin Lane and Swaminathan,Vanitha 2020. "Strategic Brand Management", 5th  edition, Pearson  
 Keller, Kevin Lane: Best Practice Cases in Branding, 3rd ed., Upper Saddle River, NJ: Prentice-Hall, 2008,

References

 Kevin Lane Keller, E. B. Osborn Professor of Marketing. Dartmouth College. Accessed February 24, 2011.

1956 births
Living people
American business theorists
Branding consultants
American business writers
Marketing people
Marketing theorists
Advertising theorists
Business speakers
Tuck School of Business faculty
Cornell University alumni
Duke University faculty
Duke University alumni
People from Hanover, New Hampshire